Just Gold is a 1913 American short drama film directed by  D. W. Griffith.

Cast
 Lionel Barrymore as First Brother
 Alfred Paget as Second Brother
 Charles West as Third Brother
 Joseph McDermott as Fourth Brother
 Kate Bruce as The Mother
 Charles Hill Mailes as The Father
 Lillian Gish as The Sweetheart
 Dorothy Gish as The Sweetheart's Friend
 Kathleen Butler as At Farewell
 Adolph Lestina as At Farewell / InTown
 W. Chrystie Miller
 Frank Opperman as At Farewell / In Town

See also
 D. W. Griffith filmography
 Lillian Gish filmography
 Lionel Barrymore filmography

External links

1913 films
Films directed by D. W. Griffith
1913 short films
American silent short films
1913 drama films
American black-and-white films
Silent American drama films
1910s American films